Blind Date is a 1987 American romantic comedy film directed by Blake Edwards and starring Bruce Willis (in his first credited lead role) and Kim Basinger. Blind Date earned mostly negative reviews from critics, but was a financial success and opened at number one at the box office.

Plot
Walter Davis (Bruce Willis) allows his brother, Ted (Phil Hartman), to set him up on a blind date with Ted's wife's cousin, Nadia (Kim Basinger).

Nadia is shy and the two experience some awkwardness. However, as the evening goes on, Nadia begins to drink and behave in a wild manner. (A warning about her behavior under the influence of alcohol had been given by Ted's wife, but when Ted relayed the warning to Walter, he made it sound like a joke and strongly hinted that Walter might actually benefit from giving her alcohol.)

To make matters worse, Nadia's jealous ex-boyfriend, David (John Larroquette), shows up and exacerbates the situation by stalking the couple all night, assaulting Walter several times, even ramming Walter's car with his own.

Walter ends up being driven insane by Nadia's mishaps and David's pursuit; she gets him fired at the dinner; his car is destroyed; after wreaking havoc at a party, Walter gets arrested for menacing David with a mugger's revolver. He even forces David to do a moonwalk before firing at the frightened man's feet.

Nadia posts $10,000 in bail and agrees to marry David if he will help Walter avoid prison time. Before the wedding, Walter gives Nadia chocolates filled with brandy and attempts to sabotage the marriage. Chaos ensues.

In the end, Nadia humiliates David by rejecting him to the delight of their guests as she and Walter decide to give their relationship another shot.  The final scene shows Nadia and Walter on their honeymoon on a beach, with a two-liter bottle of Coca-Cola chilling instead of champagne.

Cast

Production
The film was originally intended for the recently married Madonna and Sean Penn, but both backed out after the project failed to attract a director. The project moved from Handmade Films to Blake Edwards, who agreed to direct contingent on script changes. The studio agreed and the movie was re-cast with Willis and Basinger.

Billy Vera & The Beaters appear in the bar scene, playing several songs.

Reception
On the review aggregator website Rotten Tomatoes, the film has an approval rating of 24%, based on 25 reviews, with an average rating of 4.60/10. The website's consensus reads, "Blind Date has all the ingredients for a successful madcap comedy, but the end results suggest director Blake Edwards has lost his once-reliable touch." On Metacritic, the film has a weighted average score of 49 out of 100, based on 14 critics, indicating "mixed or average reviews". Audiences polled by CinemaScore gave the film an average grade of "B" on an A+ to F scale.

Roger Ebert of the Chicago Sun-Times gave the film two and a half stars out of four and wrote: "There are individual moments in this movie that are as funny as anything Edwards has ever done, but they're mostly sight gags and don't grow out of the characters. The characters, alas, are the problem. Willis plays a nerd so successfully that he fades into the shrubbery and never really makes us care about his fate. Basinger, so ravishing in most of her movies, looks dowdy this time. Her hair is always in her eyes, and her eyes are her best feature. [...] Most of the time I wasn't laughing. But when I was laughing, I was genuinely laughing - there are some absolutely inspired moments".
Variety calls it "essentially a running string of gags with snippets of catchy dialog in-between".

Soundtrack
The soundtrack to the motion picture was released by Rhino Records in 1987.

 Track listing
 "Simply Meant to Be" - Gary Morris & Jennifer Warnes
 "Let You Get Away" - Billy Vera & The Beaters
 "Oh, What a Nite" - Billy Vera & The Beaters
 "Anybody Seen Her?" - Billy Vera & The Beaters
 "Talked About Lover" - Keith L'Neire
 "Crash, Bang, Boom" - Hubert Tubbs
 "Something for Nash" - Henry Mancini
 "Treasures" - Stanley Jordan
 "Simply Meant to Be" (Instrumental) - Henry Mancini

References

External links

 
 
 
 

1987 films
1987 romantic comedy films
American romantic comedy films
American screwball comedy films
1980s English-language films
American slapstick comedy films
TriStar Pictures films
Films scored by Henry Mancini
Films directed by Blake Edwards
Films with screenplays by Dale Launer
1980s American films